Boston is a small town situated in the Mkhomazi and Elands River valley  of KwaZulu-Natal, South Africa.

Populated places in the Impendle Local Municipality